A list of films produced in Argentina in 1944:

Images

External links and references
 Argentine films of 1944 at the Internet Movie Database

1944
Films
Lists of 1944 films by country or language